Traveller 15mm Miniatures is a line of miniatures produced by Citadel Miniatures for Traveller.

Contents
Traveller Miniatures is a line of 15mm miniatures , and five boxed sets of Traveller figures were released initially – Adventurers, The Military, Ship's Crew, Citizens, and Aliens.

Reception
Robert McMahon reviewed Traveller Miniatures in The Space Gamer No. 48. McMahon commented that "Compared with other Traveller lines I've seen, Citadel easily leads the field.  These figures are excellent additions to a Traveller collection, particularly as they come in Traveller-sized boxes and include foam padding – essential, considering the way many people treat their miniatures.  I heartily recommend these figure packs to all science fiction miniature enthusiasts."

References

See also
List of lines of miniatures

Miniature figures
Traveller (role-playing game)